Lionheart, also known as Lionheart: The Children's Crusade, is a 1987 adventure film directed by Franklin J. Schaffner and produced by Talia Shire and Stanley O'Toole. Shire's brother, Francis Ford Coppola, initially planned to direct the film but instead opted to be executive producer along with Shire's husband, Jack Schwartzman. The screenplay was written by Menno Meyjes and Richard Outten from a story by Meyjes. The composer Jerry Goldsmith wrote the score. The film was released in August 1987. It was distributed by Orion Pictures.

Plot
Loosely based on the historical Children's Crusade, the story follows Robert Nerra, an exiled young knight, played by Eric Stoltz, who leads a band of orphans to join the Third Crusade with King Richard the Lionheart while protecting the children from the Black Prince (Gabriel Byrne), a disillusioned crusader turned child slave trader (not to be confused with the real-life Edward, the Black Prince).

Cast
 Eric Stoltz as Robert Nerra
 Gabriel Byrne as Black Prince
 Nicola Cowper as Blanche
 Dexter Fletcher as Michael
 Deborah Moore as Mathilda
 Nicholas Clay as Charles De Montfort
 Bruce Purchase as Simon Nerra
 Neil Dickson as King Richard
 Penny Downie as Madelaine
 Nadim Sawalha as Selim
 John Franklyn-Robbins as The Abbot
 Chris Pitt as Odo
 Matthew Sim as Hugo
 Paul Rhys as Mayor of the Underground City
 Sammi Davis as Baptista
 Wayne Goddard as Louis
 Courtney Roper-Knight as David
 Michael Sundin as Bertram (incorrectly credited as "Michel Sundin")
 Louise Seacombe as Girl from Plague Village
 Patrick Durkin as Fat Peasant
 Haluk Bilginer as Merchant
 Ralph Michael as William Nerra
 Barry Stanton as Duke De Bar
 Jan Waters as Duchess De Bar
 Ann Firbank as Catatonic Woman

Production
Lionheart was a big budget film. It was filmed in Hungary and Portugal, utilizing several castles and hundreds of Slavic children hired as extras.  The film was Schaffner's penultimate film and represented the final collaboration between the director and his friend Jerry Goldsmith (together they previously worked on Planet of the Apes, Patton, Papillon, and The Boys from Brazil).

Music
In 1987 Varèse Sarabande released the soundtrack on two separate albums, with Jerry Goldsmith conducting the Hungarian State Opera Orchestra; in 1994 the label released a one-disc edition as Lionheart: The Epic Symphonic Score featuring all of Volume 1 and six tracks from Volume 2.  Then in the summer of 2021, the complete score was released as “The Deluxe Edition” (on two discs).

Volume One

Volume Two

Lionheart: The Epic Symphonic Score

Lionheart: The Deluxe Edition-Original Motion Picture SoundtrackDisc I

Disc II

previously unreleased bonus tracks sourced from reference materials as original master tapes were unavailable

Release 
The distributor, Orion Pictures, delayed its theatrical release but when the film was finally shown in August 1987 in Canada, the limited release garnered negative reviews.  Therefore, the movie was largely unseen until being shown on pay television and finally released on VHS tape and DVD.

Leonard Maltin's initial review was anything but complimentary: "A weak script does in this spiritless saga...Intended for kids, but too silly and boring to engage them." Maltin later saw the film again, and changed his rating from "BOMB" to 3-out-of-a-possible-4 stars: "Richly produced, well-acted, with a superb Jerry Goldsmith score; it's a shame this sincere, if slight, film received almost no theatrical release."  Variety's reviewer watched the film at the Cineplex Odeon Canada Square theatre in Toronto on August 18, 1987.  The review appeared in the August 26, 1987 issue describing the movie as "a flaccid, limp kiddie adventure yarn with little of its intended grand epic sweep realized" and accurately predicted that the movie "should head straight for the home video shelves".

Home media
Warner Home Video brought out a VHS tape in July 1994 and issued a DVD in December 2009 on the Warner Archives label.

See also
Nash, Jay Robert and Stanley Ralph Ross.  The Motion Picture Guide 1988 Annual.  Evanston, Illinois: CineBooks, Inc., 1988, pp. 165–166.
Weinberg, Marc.  "Hidden from a Theatre Near You" in Orange Coast Magazine, June 1989, p. 248.

References

External links 

1987 films
Films directed by Franklin J. Schaffner
Orion Pictures films
1980s adventure films
Films set in the 12th century
Crusades films
Media about the Children's Crusade
Cultural depictions of Richard I of England
Films scored by Jerry Goldsmith
Films shot in Hungary
Films shot in Portugal
1980s English-language films
American adventure films
1980s American films